Drca or DRCA may refer to:

 Distal right coronary artery, one of several coronary arteries.
Drča (pronounced [ˈdəɾtʃa]) a village in the foothills of the Gorjanci Hills in Slovenia
 :sr:Drča, Serbian family name
Luka Drča Serbian basketball player
Dutch Reformed Church in Africa, former denomination